Walter Addison may refer to:

Walter Dulany Addison (1769–1848), Episcopal clergyman and Chaplain of the United States Senate
Walter E. Addison (1863–1925), American lawyer and politician